Al-Nuʿmān ibn al-Mundhir, known in Greek sources as Naamanes was a king of the Ghassanids, a Christian Arab tribe allied to the Byzantine Empire. The eldest son of al-Mundhir III ibn al-Harith, he rose in revolt with his tribe after his father was treacherously arrested by the Byzantines in 581. After two years of revolt, seeking to reconcile himself with the Empire, he visited the new emperor, Maurice (r. 582–602), at Constantinople. Refusing to renounce his Monophysite faith, he was arrested and exiled to Sicily, where his father had been banned earlier. This event marked the end of the Ghassanid control over the Byzantines' Arab foederati and the fragmentation of this strong buffer against invasions from the desert.

Sources
 
 
 
 

Nu'man 06
6th-century Ghassanid kings
6th-century monarchs in the Middle East
Byzantine rebels
Byzantine exiles
6th-century Arabs
Arab Christians